The International Council of the Aeronautical Sciences (ICAS) is a worldwide institution, established as an international forum for individual national aeronautical professional associations.

History
It was formed on 29 January 1957 at a conference in the US. The first ICAS Congress was held in Spain in 1958. Frank Wattendorf, of AGARD, was the first Director.

A second meeting was held in Paris, with Hugh Latimer Dryden of the National Advisory Committee for Aeronautics, and representatives from ONERA (Office National d'Etudes et de Recherches Aérospatiales), the Royal Aeronautical Society (RAeS), the WGL (now the Deutsche Gesellschaft für Luft- und Raumfahrt), the Association Française des Ingénieurs et Techniciens de l'Aéronautique (now the Association Aéronautique et Astronautique de France), and the Aeronautical Research Institute of Sweden.

Congress
It holds a biennial international congress in September. In 1986 it was held in London. In 2000 the congress was held in North Yorkshire. The 2018 Congress was held by Associação Brasileira de Engenharia e Ciências Mecânicas (ABCM) in Brazil. The 2020 congress will be held in Shanghai, China.

Presidents
 Raymond Bisplinghoff 1978
 Boris Laschka 1986
 Paolo Santini 1990
 Murray Scott 2013
 Christian Mari 2015
 Susan Ying 2017
 Shinji Suzuki 2017
 Dimitri Mavris 2023

Structure
The secretariat of ICAS is at Deutsche Gesellschaft für Luft- und Raumfahrt (DLR) in Bonn. It was first headquartered at the American Institute of Aeronautics and Astronautics (AIAA), the DLR from 1978, the RAeS in 1986, the Nederlandse Vereniging voor Luchtvaarttechniek from 1990, the AAAF (Association Aéronautique et Astronautique de France) from 1997, then Sweden from 2002, and Germany from January 2011.

See also
 Council of European Aerospace Societies (CEAS)
 Fédération Aéronautique Internationale (FAI)
 International Astronautical Federation
 International Energy Forum

References

External links
 ICAS
 ICAS 2020

1957 in aviation
Aerospace engineering organizations
Aviation organisations based in Germany
International aviation organizations
International organisations based in Bonn
Scientific organizations established in 1957
Scientific organisations based in Germany